Scoparia ambigualis is a species of moth of the family Crambidae described by Friedrich Treitschke in 1829. It is found in Europe and Asia Minor and possibly in Guangdong and Shanxi in China.

The wingspan is 15–22 mm. The forewings are whitish, more or less sprinkled with grey and black; a black ochreous-mixed mark from base of costa; lines whitish, dark -edged, first irregular, second angulated above middle; orbicular elongate, brownish, more or less black-edged, resting on first line; claviform dot- like, black, seldom elongated to touch first line; discal spot 8-shaped, incompletely black edged, upper and sometimes lower half pale greyish-ochreous or brownish; terminal area dark, subterminal line cloudy, whitish; a terminal series of blackish marks. Hindwings are prismatic grey-whitish, terminally suffused with grey.

The moth flies from May to September depending on the location.

The larvae feed on valerian and probably also on various mosses.

References

External links
 Waarneming.nl  
 Lepidoptera of Belgium
 Scoparia ambigualis at UKMoths

Scorparia
Moths of Europe
Moths described in 1829
Insects of Turkey